The Sulawesi naked-backed fruit bat (Dobsonia exoleta) is a species of megabat in the family Pteropodidae. It is endemic to Indonesia.

References

Mammals of Sulawesi
Bats of Southeast Asia
Mammals described in 1909
Taxa named by Knud Andersen
Dobsonia
Taxonomy articles created by Polbot